Harvey Webster Emery (November 8, 1827October 13, 1862) was an American lawyer, Republican politician, and Wisconsin pioneer.  He was a member of the Wisconsin State Assembly, representing Columbia County for one term, and then served as a Union Army officer in the American Civil War.  He died of disease during the second year of the war.

Biography
Harvey W. Emery was born in Lisbon, New Hampshire, in November 1827.  He was educated there and attended the Newbury Seminary, in Newbury, Vermont, to prepare for college.  He then attended Norwich University, where he graduated with a bachelor's degree in 1852.

After graduating, he taught school and served as principal at the Danville, Vermont, academy, and then the Morgantown, Virginia, female seminary. While in Morgantown, he read law in the office of Waitman T. Willey and was admitted to the bar in 1855.  Later that year, he moved to Portage, Wisconsin, and established a legal practice in partnership with Edgar P. Hill.

In 1860, he was elected to the Wisconsin State Assembly from Columbia County's 1st Assembly district, running on the Republican Party ticket.

The outbreak of the American Civil War occurred just after the adjournment of the 1861 session of the Legislature, and Emery immediately volunteered for service with the Union Army.  He was commissioned lieutenant colonel of the 5th Wisconsin Infantry Regiment and mustered into service July 13, 1861. With the 5th Wisconsin Infantry, he participated in the Peninsula campaign and distinguished himself at the Battle of Williamsburg.  In the Summer of 1862, he fell ill and was confined to a hospital.  He never fully recovered from his disease, but returned to the regiment in August and participated in the Second Battle of Bull Run and the Battle of Antietam.  In September, he was so racked with disease, he was taken back to his parents' home in Lisbon, New Hampshire, where he died on October 13, 1862.

Personal life and family
Emery married Mary Jane Dow on August 23, 1853.  She was also a graduate of Newbury Seminary.  They had two daughters together.

References

External links
 

1827 births
1862 deaths
Republican Party members of the Wisconsin State Assembly
19th-century American politicians
People from Lisbon, New Hampshire
People from Portage, Wisconsin
People of Wisconsin in the American Civil War
Union Army officers
United States politicians killed during the Civil War